Drayton Bassett is a civil parish in the district of Lichfield, Staffordshire, England.  It contains six buildings that are recorded in the National Heritage List for England.  Of these, one is listed at Grade II*, the middle grade, and the others are at Grade II, the lowest grade.  The parish contains the village of Drayton Bassett and the surrounding area.  The Minworth to Fazeley branch of the Birmingham and Fazeley Canal passes through the parish, and the listed buildings associated with this are three bridges of differing types.  The other listed buildings are a church, a house, and a farmhouse.


Key

Buildings

References

Citations

Sources

Lists of listed buildings in Staffordshire